Sears Island, known as Wassumkeag or shining beach by the indigenous Wabanaki tribes of northern New England, is located off the coast of Searsport in Waldo County, Maine, at the top of Penobscot Bay.
The island is the largest undeveloped, uninhabited, causeway-accessible island on the eastern coast of the United States. It is part of the Town of Searsport.

History and geography 
It was named after David Sears of Boston after he agreed to grant a large sum of money towards founding of Searsport. Sears Island is state-owned land, but is part of the town of Searsport. It used to be known as Brigadier's Island.

A causeway was built approximately 20 years ago upon what had been a tidal bar. At high tide Sears Island was a true island, and at low tide the exposed gravel bar allowed for easy access. Locals would drive over at low tide, always careful to return in time, lest they would have to wade or swim and leave the car stranded until the next tide. Several generations ago there were farms on the island. Only stone cellar holes and a few small fields remain today.

Sears Island acts as a great element barrier for one of the most well-protected harbors in the state of Maine: Stockton Harbor, an attractive anchorage for not only the protection it offers, but also its convenience to upper Penobscot Bay towns Searsport, Belfast and Castine. Bar Harbor is about an hour's car ride east, and both Camden and Bangor are about a half-hour south and north, respectively.  Sears Island also has views of Cape Jellison.

It is home to a number of species of birds, mammals, fish, amphibians and plant life. The shallow shoal off the west side of the island supports meadows of eelgrass (Zostera marina) and other nursery habitats and features that play an important role in the fish and shellfish populations of greater Penobscot Bay.

Environmental controversies
The possible industrial development of the island has been a point of controversy for many years.  Writer E. B. White, a resident of nearby Brooklin, Maine, noted in a 1975 essay for the New Yorker that he had attended an evening forum about a Central Maine Power Company proposal to construct a nuclear power plant on Sears Island. White reported to New Yorker readers that the Central Maine Power Company "feels very good about nuclear generating plants, is not worried about radiation or accidents." In response to a goat farmer, their spokesman acknowledged radioactive "iodine can contaminate milk... [b]ut he was cheerful about the prospect.  You would simply put the animals on a controlled diet, he said, and after about forty days the radioactivity would be gone."  Facing local opposition, the plant was not built.

Since the 1980s, successive Maine governors have promoted development of the island as a general cargo port (Joseph Brennan; John McKernan) a wood-chip port; (Angus King) an LNG terminal; (John Baldacci, 1st term), and an intermodal freight transport hub for global container ship traffic (Baldacci's 2nd term).  In response, the Sierra Club of New England waged a seven-year struggle in federal courts in the mid-1980s and early 1990s to keep Sears Island free of development. Key cases included: Sierra Club v. Marsh, (1985),  Sierra Club v. Secretary of Transportation. (1985),  Sierra Club v. Marsh (1989) and Sierra Club v. Marsh (1992)

On February 19, 2009, however, Penobscot Bay environmental activist Ron Huber filed an 80-C appeal in Maine Superior Court "to rescind the Jan. 22, 2009, conservation easement until the MDOT has fully complied with the requirements of the Maine Sensible Transportation Policy Act and the Maine Site Location of Development Law." Maine Superior Court Justice Jeffrey Hjelm reviewed the cases. On May 14, 2009, Hjelm consolidated the three cases. On September 8, 2010, Justice Hjelm dismissed all three cases as premature, concluding that the current lack of port development, and lack of any interest in port development by the Plaintifs, made the injury theoretical and impossible to evaluate: the Plaintiffs as yet lacked demonstrable standing to sue.

On December 17, 2010 Plaintiff Huber appealed Hjelm's decisio n to the Maine Supreme Judicial Court.  On May 3, 2011, the Maine Supreme Judicial Court affirmed Superior Court Justice Hjelm's decision.

Many Penobscot Bay area environmentalists and tourism-based businesses have expressed environmental and aesthetic concerns about further industrializing this portion of the coast.

Uses 

Visitors can drive out to the end of the causeway, and despite the presence of a road traveling down the center of the island to the southern tip, they may not actually drive on the island itself, as it is blocked off by large concrete blocks and fencing.  Visitors however, may walk, hike, bike, and explore the island, by the road — approximately long — which has views of Penobscot Bay, Cape Rosier/Castine, and Islesboro Island), and by the many walking trails that zig-zag their way around the island.  Beaches surround the perimeter of the island.

See also
List of islands of Maine

Notes

External links 
 Maine Public Radio News stories about Sears Island
 State & federal agency documents from 1990s & 2005 Sears Island port efforts

Islands of Waldo County, Maine
Tourist attractions in Waldo County, Maine
Uninhabited Atlantic islands of the United States
Tombolos
Searsport, Maine
Tidal islands of the United States
Islands of Maine
Coastal islands of Maine